The following is a comparative list of tablet computers belonging to the Google Nexus line of devices, using the Android operating system.

See also
Comparison of Google Nexus smartphones
List of Google Play edition devices

References

Computing comparisons
Google Nexus
Nexus tablets, Comparison of
Tablet computers
Touchscreen portable media players